John Prettyjohns, VC (11 June 1823 – 20 January 1887) was a Royal Marine and a recipient of the Victoria Cross, the highest award for gallantry in the face of the enemy that can be awarded to British and Commonwealth forces.

Early life
Prettyjohns was born at Dean Prior, near to Buckfastleigh, Devon, to William Pethyjohns (1800–1889) and his wife Margaret ( Pow, 1805–1866). His early years were spent labouring in Buckfastleigh.

Military career
On 10 June 1844, Prettyjohns enlisted as a private in the 59th Company, Plymouth Division, for unlimited service – and collected 2s 6d for attestation. On the following day, he collected a bounty of £3 17s 6d for oath of allegiance. He disembarked at Chatham on 23 August 1849, and joined HMS Bellerophon on 7 November 1850. On this ship, he embarked for the Mediterranean in January 1852, being promoted to corporal on 15 January. On 17 October 1854, HMS Bellerophon bombarded Sevastopol during the Crimean War.

On 5 November 1854, Corporal John Prettyjohns won the Victoria Cross during the Battle of Inkerman.

He was promoted to colour sergeant on 29 April, and on 26 June a VC was sent to the Admiralty and despatched to China for presentation. On 17 December 1863 his final tour of duty came to an end. He was discharged on 16 June 1865 after 21 years and 6 days service – 16 years 94 days of which were spent at sea or abroad.

Personal life
Prettyjohns married his first cousin, Elizabeth Prettyjohns (7 May 1826 – 19 August 1912), at Plymouth Register Office on 10 February 1850. They had two children: Elizabeth (Bessie) Prettyjohns (1857 – 13 July 1889); and Alice Maud Prettyjohns (28 February 1865 – 4 July 1960).

Following his discharge, Prettyjohns retired to the Greater Manchester area, and became a Golf Club steward at Whalley Range Bowling Club, Albert Road, Withington, Lancashire. He died on 20 January 1887 at Chorlton upon Medlock, Lancashire and is buried in the Southern Cemetery, Manchester.

Legacy
The Royal Marines hold a procession each autumn to honour the memory of Prettyjohns. His Victoria Cross and other medals are displayed at the Royal Marines Museum, Southsea, England.

References

1823 births
1887 deaths
People from Buckfastleigh
British recipients of the Victoria Cross
Royal Marines ranks
Crimean War recipients of the Victoria Cross
Royal Navy personnel of the Crimean War
Royal Navy personnel of the Second Opium War
Royal Navy recipients of the Victoria Cross
Burials at Southern Cemetery, Manchester